Fisher Hall was a building at Miami University in Oxford, Ohio. Originally the Oxford Female College, the building was later used as a sanitarium and was purchased by Miami in 1925. It served as a first-year men's residence hall (though it was briefly a women's hall during World War II), Naval training school, and theatre. The building remained in use as a dormitory until 1958, when the upper floors were condemned and the theatre remained the only part of the building still in use. With the construction of Miami's Center for Performing Arts in 1968, the theatre became unused and the building turned into a storage facility. After a push to save the building in the mid-1970s, the hall was razed because the cost of renovating the building was identical to the costs of new construction. Miami University's hotel, The Marcum, was built in 1982 on the former site of Fisher Hall.

Fisher Hall was added to the National Register of Historic Places in 1978, but delisted that same year.

Construction and planning 

Fisher Hall was constructed over a period of four years and completed in 1856. The simple and reserved style of the windows and spacing suggested a Georgian tradition. The three-story building formed the letter T and the head of the T, which is the east–west section, was designed to have a major porch with an entry at each end. The center had a projecting section that enclosed a third story ballroom. There was a full basement that contained a kitchen.

It was initially built as an independent college building and then Oxford Female College occupied a remote location northeast of the developing town of Oxford, Ohio as well as Miami University. The building's brick shell varied from 12" to 16", and is a local, pale red and sand molded brick.

History 

Fisher Hall was dedicated on September 3, 1856 as the Oxford Female College. It was founded and constructed under the leadership of Reverend Dr. John Witherspoon Scott, a pioneer educator and father-in-law of President Benjamin Harrison. Ebenezer Lane, a Cincinnati judge, donated 44 acres of land on the northeast edge of Oxford as well as a substantial amount of money. The building was designed by James K. Wilson, who was a charter member of the Cincinnati Chapter of the American Institute of Architects. Fisher Hall stayed a part of the women's college until 1882. Eric Johannesen, writer of Ohio College Architecture Before 1870, called the building "one of the finest examples of institutional architecture from this period in the Midwest".

In 1867, in an attempt to preserve the school, President Robert D. Morris combined it with the Oxford Female Institute, another women's school across town. The building was to serve as a boarding institution. After Morris’ death in 1882, the old college building was sold to George F. Cook, founder of the Oxford Retreat Company, for $45,000 and used as a sanitarium by Dr. Cook until the mid-1920s.

Miami purchased the building on August 15, 1925 and remodeled it as a freshman men's residence hall from 1926–1941. Then it became a Naval training school from 1941–1944. The radio school trained 5,854 men and women (WAVES). The U.S. Navy established officer-training units across the nation, and this helped to develop Miami's present Navy ROTC program. It later became a women's residence hall from 1944–1945 and then once again, a men's residence hall until 1958. The building was then used as a residence hall for women through at least the 1960-1961 school year.  Later the first floor became the Miami University Theatre until the construction of Miami's Center for Performing Arts was completed in 1968. With the construction of a new theatre in CPA, Fisher Hall became a storage repository.

Despite efforts to renovate the building, it was destroyed because the calculated cost of restoration was roughly comparable to the cost of new construction.

Naming of Fisher Hall 

Dr. Alfred H. Upham, president of Miami University at the time, named the building after Judge Elam Fisher, a trustee and alumnus of the university. The name Fisher Hall was appropriate because while the building was occupied by Oxford Female College, Elam Fisher was kicked out while courting a young lady.

Disappearance of Ronald Tammen

Ronald Tammen, 19, was a sophomore who was enrolled in Miami University School of Business Administration, now known as the Farmer School of Business. Ronald was studying in his room in Fisher Hall between 7 and 9 pm on April 19, 1953. He left his books open and other personal belongings and stepped outside but never returned to his room. His roommate reported his disappearance the next day to campus officials, who notified police the next day. After a few months, the case was placed in the unsolved files. There were three theories on his disappearance. The first was that Ronald Tammen met foul play, the second, that he was a victim of amnesia and finally, that he deliberately planned to leave the campus and start a new life under an assumed name. The third option is what is considered most likely by authorities.

An April 1960 article from the Dayton Daily News mentioned that Tammen's roommate Chuck Findlay still believed he was alive and the two of them were "very, very close". Findlay's mother who occasionally corresponded with Tammen's parents in Maple Heights, a suburb of Cleveland, said his parents have never given up hope and "they feel that he’s somewhere in the world today, and that someday he may come back to them."

The Marcum Center 

The Marcum Center, a hotel and conference facility opened in September 1982 on the former site of Fisher Hall. The building is named for Joseph T. Marcum, a Miami alumnus killed in a car accident in 1973. Marcum's father Joseph L. Marcum, also a Miami alumnus, served on the Advisory Council of the School of Business Administration and contributed money toward's the center's construction in his son's memory.

References

External links 
 Marcum Conference Center Webpage

National Register of Historic Places in Butler County, Ohio
Buildings and structures of Miami University
Demolished buildings and structures in Ohio
Buildings and structures demolished in 1979
Former National Register of Historic Places in Ohio
History of women in Ohio